The year 1974 in science and technology involved some significant events, listed below.

Astronomy and space exploration
 February 8 – After 84 days in space, the last crew of the temporary American space station Skylab return to Earth.
 February 13–15 – Sagittarius A*, thought to be the location of a supermassive black hole, is identified by Bruce Balick and Robert Brown using the baseline interferometer of the United States National Radio Astronomy Observatory.
 November 16 – Arecibo message transmitted from Arecibo Observatory (Puerto Rico) to Messier 13.
 Hawking radiation is predicted by Stephen Hawking.

Computer Science
 The Mark-8 microcomputer based on the Intel 8008 microprocessor is designed by Jonathan Titus. It is announced on the cover of the July 1974 issue of Radio-Electronics as "Your Personal Minicomputer".

History of science
 F. W. Winterbotham publishes The Ultra secret: the inside story of Operation Ultra, Bletchley Park and Enigma, the first popular account of cryptography carried out at Bletchley Park during World War II.

Mathematics
 Yves Hellegouarch proposes a connection between Fermat's Last Theorem and the Frey curve.

Medicine
 September 25 – 1974 – The first "Tommy John surgery" for replacement of ulnar collateral ligament of elbow joint is performed by Frank Jobe in the United States.
 Identification of controlled trials in perinatal medicine, as advocated by Archie Cochrane, begins in Cardiff, Wales.
 Henry Heimlich describes the "Heimlich Maneuver" as a treatment for choking.

Paleoanthropology and paleontology
 November 24 – A group of paleoanthropologists discover remains of a 3.2-million-year-old skeleton of an Australopithecus afarensis in the Afar Depression of Ethiopia, nicknaming her "Lucy".

Physics
 May 18 – "Smiling Buddha", India's first nuclear test explosion takes place underground at Pokhran.
 "November Revolution": J/ψ meson, the first particle found to contain a charm quark, discovered by teams at the Brookhaven National Laboratory, led by Samuel Ting, and at the Stanford Linear Accelerator Center, led by Burton Richter.

Physiology
 May – British neuroscientists John Hughes and Hans Kosterlitz announce their isolation of the peptides met- and leu-enkephalin.

Psychology
 Civilized Man's Eight Deadly Sins is published by Konrad Lorenz.
 Leon Kamin demonstrates that Sir Cyril Burt's influential research into heritability of IQ using twin studies shows evidence of statistical falsification.

Technology
 June 26 – The Universal Product Code is scanned for the first time, to sell a package of Wrigley's chewing gum at the Marsh Supermarket in Troy, Ohio, the first use of barcode technology in American retailing.
 Stephen Salter invents the "Salter Duck", a wave energy converter.

Zoology
 January 7 – Outbreak of 4-year Gombe Chimpanzee War in Tanzania, reported by Jane Goodall.
 Digital dermatitis in cattle identified in Italy by Cheli and Mortellaro.

Other events
 Rubik's Cube invented by Ernő Rubik.

Awards
 Fields Prize in Mathematics: Enrico Bombieri and David Mumford
 Nobel Prizes
 Physics – Martin Ryle, Antony Hewish
 Chemistry – Paul J. Flory
 Medicine – Albert Claude, Christian de Duve, George Emil Palade
 Turing Award – Donald Knuth

Births
 March 10 – Biz Stone, American computing entrepreneur
 August 8 – Manjul Bhargava, Canadian-born mathematician
 August 11 – Sarah-Jayne Blakemore, English cognitive neuroscientist
 September 28 – Sunil Kumar Verma, Indian biologist

Deaths
 February 4 – S. N. Bose, Indian physicist (b. 1894)
 April 12 – Cornelis Simon Meijer, Dutch mathematician (b. 1904)
 May 4 – Ludwig Koch, German-born British animal sound recordist (b. 1881)
 May 18 – Harry Ricardo, English mechanical engineer (b. 1885)
 May 22 – Irmgard Flügge-Lotz (b. 1903), German-American mathematician and aerospace engineer
 June 28 – Vannevar Bush, American science administrator (b. 1890)
 July 3 – Sergey Lebedev, Soviet Russian computer scientist (b. 1902)
 August 22 – Jacob Bronowski, Polish-born British scientific polymath (b. 1908)

References

 
20th century in science
1970s in science